Kenneth Heywood Taylor FRSA (10 November 1922, in Bolton, Lancashire – 17 April 2011, in Cornwall) was an Award-winning English screenwriter.

Life
The son of a cotton mill owner from Bolton, Lancashire, Taylor was educated at Gresham's School, Holt. Under the name Ken Taylor, he wrote scripts for television drama in a career spanning more than four decades.

In 1964 The Devil and John Brown received the Best Original Teleplay Award of the Writers' Guild of Great Britain. In the same year, Taylor was named Writer of the Year by the Guild of Television Writers and Directors (later BAFTA) for his trilogy of television plays The Seekers.

The Jewel in the Crown, adapted from Paul Scott's Raj Quartet novels as a fifteen-hour mini-series, earned Ken Taylor an Emmy nomination in 1984 along with the award as Writer of the Year from the Royal Television Society, while his The Camomile Lawn (1992), adapted from Mary Wesley's book of the same name, received a BAFTA nomination. His adaptation credits also include Jane Austen's Mansfield Park, The Melancholy Hussar by Thomas Hardy, The Widowing of Mrs Holroyd by D. H. Lawrence, The Birds Fall Down by Rebecca West and The Girls of Slender Means by Muriel Spark, and The Devil's Crown.

In 1953, Taylor married Gillian Dorothea Black and they had two sons and two daughters. One son, adopted, is the Liberal Democrat politician Matthew Taylor.

Awards
Writers' Guild of Great Britain Best Original Teleplay Award, 1964
Guild of Television Writers and Directors' Writer of the Year Award, 1964
Royal Television Society Writers' Award, 1984
Fellow of the Royal Society of Antiquaries, 2008

References

External links
  
 Official web site

1922 births
2011 deaths
English male screenwriters
People educated at Gresham's School
People from Bolton
Writers from Lancashire
British male television writers
English television writers